Benson Ridge is a rugged ridge between Robb Glacier and Bondeson Glacier in Antarctica, standing  west of the north end of the Holland Range. It was mapped by the United States Geological Survey from tellurometer surveys and from Navy air photos, 1960–62, and named by the Advisory Committee on Antarctic Names for Carl S. Benson, a United States Antarctic Research Program glaciologist at Roosevelt Island, 1961–62.

See also 
Worthley Peak

References 

Ridges of the Ross Dependency
Shackleton Coast